Plano-convex may refer to:

 Plano-convex lens, in optics
 Plano-convex, a type of mudbrick used by the ancient Sumerians